Revisionism represents various ideas, principles, and theories that are based on a revision of Marxism. According to their critics, this involve a significant revision of fundamental Marxist theories and premises, and usually involve making an alliance with the bourgeois class. Academics have used revisionism to describe post-Stalin, Eastern European writers who criticized one-party rule and argued in favour of freedom of the press and of the arts, intra- and sometimes inter-party democracy, independent labor unions, the abolition of bureaucratic privileges, and the subordination of police to the judiciary.

In Marxist discourse, revisionism often carries pejorative connotations and the term has been used by many different factions. It is typically applied to others and rarely as a self-description. By extension, people who view themselves as fighting against revisionism have often self-identified as anti-revisionists. Revisionism is most often used as an ephitet by those Marxists who believe that such revisions are unwarranted and represent a watering down or abandonment of Marxism—one such common example is the negation of class struggle.

History 

Revisionism has been used in a number of contexts to refer to different or claimed revisions of Marxist theory. Those who opposed Karl Marx's revolution through his lens of a violent uprising and sought out more peaceful, electoral means for a socialist revolution are known as revisionists. Eduard Bernstein, a close acquaintance of Marx and Friedrich Engels, was one of the first major revisionists, and was prominent in the Social Democratic Party of Germany (SPD).

In the late 19th century, the term revisionism was used to describe democratic socialist writers, such as Bernstein, who sought to revise Marx's ideas about the transition to socialism and claimed that a revolution through force was not necessary to achieve a socialist society. The views of Bernstein gave rise to reformist theory, which asserts that socialism can be achieved through gradual peaceful reforms from within a capitalist system.

See also 

 Brezhnev Doctrine
 Deng Xiaoping Theory
 Eurocommunism
 Juche
 Goulash Communism
 Khrushchevism
 Market socialism
 National communism in Romania
 Opportunism in Marxist theory
 Politics of Fidel Castro
 Sankarism
 Syndicalism
 Xi Jinping Thought

References 

Democratic socialism
Ideology of the Chinese Communist Party
Ideology of the Communist Party of the Soviet Union
Market socialism
Marxism
Marxist terminology
Marxist theory
Social democracy
Syndicalism